The Eighth House also known as Horror Floor is a 2014 Chinese romantic thriller film directed by Zhang Li. It was released on September 19, 2014.

Cast
Tino Bao
Ni Jingyang 
Chang Le
Da Qing
Lin Peng

Reception
By September 28, it had earned ¥6.41 million at the Chinese box office.

References

2014 films
Chinese romantic thriller films
2010s romantic thriller films
2010s Mandarin-language films